Jiske Griffioen and Aniek van Koot defeated Marjolein Buis and Lucy Shuker in the final, 6–4, 6–3 to win the women's doubles wheelchair tennis title at the 2013 Australian Open. It was their first step towards an eventual Grand Slam.

Esther Vergeer and Sharon Walraven were the two-time reigning champions, but Vergeer did not compete. Walraven partnered Sabine Ellerbrock, but was defeated in the semifinals by Buis and Shuker.

The 2013 Australian Open – Wheelchair women's doubles was a tennis tournament featuring 8 paraplegic women tennis players, which was part of the NEC Tour. The tournament took place at Melbourne Park in Melbourne, Australia, from 25 January to 28 January 2012. It was the 10th edition of the Australian Open men's wheelchair event and the first Grand Slam event of 2013. The tournament was played on Plexicushion Prestige AO hard courts, which was rated a medium-fast pace by the ITF. The competition was organised by the International Tennis Federation and Tennis Australia.

Seeds
  Jiske Griffioen /  Aniek van Koot (champions)
  Lucy Shuker /  Marjolein Buis (final)

Draw

Finals

References
Draw

Wheelchair Women's Doubles
2013 Women's Doubles